Kindamba Airport  is an airstrip serving the village of Kindamba, Republic of the Congo.

See also

Transport in the Republic of the Congo
List of airports in Republic of the Congo

References

External links
OpenStreetMap - Kindamba
HERE Maps - Kindamba Airport

Bing Maps - Kindamba

Airports in the Republic of the Congo